This article documents notable spaceflight events during the year 2021. 2021 saw several spaceflight related records being set worldwide. This includes both the most orbital launch attempts and most successful orbital launches in a year. In addition, 2021 saw records set in the number of humans in orbit at one time and the most humans in space at one time.

Overview

Planetary science 
Spacecraft from three Mars exploration programs from the United Arab Emirates, China, and the United States (Hope, Tianwen-1, and Mars 2020) arrived at Mars in February.

The Perseverance rover landed on 18 February. As part of the Mars 2020 mission, the Ingenuity solar-powered drone performed the first powered aircraft flight on another planet in human history. It has a communications link with the Perseverance rover and used autonomous control during its short scripted flights.

The Tianwen-1 lander and Zhurong rover landed on 14 May, after conducting a geological survey of the landing site from orbit. Zhurong was deployed on the Martian surface on 22 May, making China the second country in history to successfully deploy a rover on Mars. The rover then dropped a remotely controlled camera on the ground, which took a group photo of the lander and rover on 1 June.

Lucy, a NASA space probe, was launched on 16 October and began a 12-year journey to seven different asteroids, visiting six Jupiter trojans, and one Main Belt asteroid. Trojans are asteroids which share Jupiter's orbit around the Sun, orbiting either ahead of or behind the planet.

The Double Asteroid Redirection Test (DART) was launched on 24 November. It was a space probe that visited the double asteroid Didymos and demonstrated the kinetic effects of crashing an impactor spacecraft into an asteroid moon for planetary defense purposes. The mission was intended to test whether a spacecraft impact could successfully deflect an asteroid on a collision course with Earth.

The Juno probe continues its exploration of Jupiter. Originally, its mission was intended to conclude on 31 July by burning up in Jupiter's atmosphere following its 35th perijove. However, on 8 January 2021, NASA announced that the probe was granted a second mission extension through September 2025, which could include future flybys of Europa and Io.

Lastly the Tianwen-1 orbiter released another 
deployable camera in Mars orbit on 31 December 2021, to image itself and Northern Mars Ice Cap from Mars orbit.

Lunar exploration 
China's Chang'e-4 lander and Yutu-2 rover reached 1000-days milestone on the far side of the Moon while still being operational.

Human spaceflight 
The first feature-length fiction film to be filmed in space by professional film-makers, the Russian film The Challenge was filmed onboard ISS in October 2021 by Russian director Klim Shipenko with actress Yulia Peresild starring.

A new record was set for the largest number of humans in orbit (14) on 16 September 2021, and a new record for the largest number of humans in space (19) at one time (10 in the ISS, 3 on board the Tiangong Space Station, 6 on board New Shepard-19) was set on 11 December 2021.

Space Stations 
China began construction of the Tiangong space station (phase 3 of the Tiangong program) with the launch of the Tianhe core module on 29 April 2021. A Tianzhou cargo delivery mission was launched on 29 May 2021, and the Shenzhou 12 crewed mission on 17 June 2021. Shenzhou 13 has launched a second crew on 15 October and conducted their first EVA on 7 November, making Wang Yaping the first Chinese female astronaut to perform a spacewalk.

The ISS saw one module being permanently removed from the orbiting complex and two new modules being added. Pirs became the first habitable element of the station to be decommissioned, undocked, and deorbited on 26 July 2021 to make room for Nauka, the first new module in the Russian Orbital Segment of ISS (indeed, first new module for the whole of ISS) in years. The Russian made Nauka module was launched from Baikonur Cosmodrome on 21 July 2021. Nauka carried the European Robotic Arm (ERA) along with it to the station. The ISS was also joined by a new Russian node module Prichal, launched 24 November 2021.

Space tourism 
In the United States, Virgin Galactic conducted the first suborbital human spaceflight from New Mexico on 22 May 2021 with SpaceShipTwo VSS Unity. Two astronauts were on board, Frederick Sturckow and David Mackay. The flight was also the first suborbital human spaceflight from Spaceport America. A second flight, carrying company founder Richard Branson and three other passengers, was conducted on 11 July 2021.

The first crewed flight of Blue Origin's New Shepard suborbital spacecraft successfully sent four civilians, including company founder Jeff Bezos, into space just above the Kármán line on 20 July 2021. Blue Origin's second crewed suborbital flight of New Shepard occurred 13 October 2021, this time not including Bezos but the actor William Shatner and 3 others. The third flight of Blue Origin's New Shepard, again a suborbital flight, took place 11 December 2021. This was the first flight with six passengers on board, the full number of passengers the New Shepard is designed for.

On 16 September 2021 SpaceX launched the Inspiration4 mission. The mission successfully completed the first orbital spaceflight with only private citizens aboard. The mission was privately financed by Jared Isaacman who participated in the flight with 3 other passengers (the others did not pay for their flight). The mission orbited the Earth at high orbit (higher than ISS) and splashed down in the Atlantic, lasting almost three days.

On 8 December 2021 the Russian Soyuz MS-20 spacecraft began a 12-day space tourism mission to ISS, resuming space tourism activity in the ISS after over a decade; the previous space tourist to visit the station was the Canadian Guy Laliberté in 2009. The 2021 space tourist mission took two tourists, the Japanese billionaire Yusaku Maezawa and his assistant Yozo Hirano, to the station.

Space telescopes 

The IXPE telescope was launched on a Falcon 9 on 9 December 2021. The long-delayed James Webb Space Telescope, the largest optical space telescope ever built, was launched to the Sun–Earth  point by a European Ariane 5 rocket on 25 December 2021.

Rocket innovation 
The trend towards cost reduction in access to orbit continued with the continued development of smaller rockets by multiple commercial launch providers and larger next-generation vehicles by more established players.

While multiple high-profile next-generation rockets were originally planned to make their maiden orbital flights in 2021, all were ultimately shifted to 2022 and beyond due to development delays. These included the maiden flight of Vulcan Centaur, designed to gradually replace Atlas V and Delta IV Heavy at lower costs, which was postponed in June 2021; the Mitsubishi Heavy Industries's H3 launch vehicle, planned to cost less than half that of its predecessor H-IIA; the maiden launch of NASA's Space Launch System (SLS) super heavy-lift rocket on the Artemis 1, which was postponed mid-year to early 2022; and the first orbital test flight of a prototype of the SpaceX Starship.

The latter rocket's development continued through 2021 at SpaceX's facility in Boca Chica, Texas, with a suborbital testing campaign continuing from the previous year. Starship prototype SN15 was the first testbed of the future rocket family to survive a launch and soft touchdown on 5 May 2021. The first-ever full-stack fit check of Starship prototype SN20 with the booster stage followed in August.

Orbital and suborbital launches

Deep-space rendezvous

Extravehicular activities (EVAs)

Space debris events

Orbital launch statistics

By country 
For the purposes of this section, the yearly tally of orbital launches by country assigns each flight to the country of origin of the rocket, not to the launch services provider or the spaceport. For example, Soyuz launches by Arianespace in Kourou are counted under Russia because Soyuz-2 is a Russian rocket.

By rocket

By family

By type

By configuration

By spaceport

By orbit

Suborbital launch statistics

By country 
For the purposes of this section, the yearly tally of suborbital launches by country assigns each flight to the country of origin of the rocket, not to the launch services provider or the spaceport. Flights intended to fly below 80 km (50 mi) are omitted.

See also
 Timeline of Solar System exploration#2020s

Notes

References

External links

 
Spaceflight by year
Spaceflight